Abel/Kein is an album released by Unsraw on September 26, 2007. It contains the songs from the previously released EP's Abel & Kein, and 1 additional song.

Track listing

"Social Faker" – 4:18
"STARVING MOON" – 3:26
"Platonic Bitch" – 3:59
"DRAIN" – 3:48
"Sakura no Namida" (桜の涙) – 4:48
"CLEVAGE" – 3:59
"Sora" (空) – 6:01
"Addicted To It" – 3:18
"S.I.G." – 3:42
"~Tsuioku no Kanata~" (～追憶の彼方～) – 5:34
"EVE (Bonus Track in 2nd press)" – 5:06 / "LUST (Bonus Track in EU version)" – 2:55

Personnel

Yuuki – vocals
Rai – guitar
Tetsu – guitar
Jun – bass guitar
Shou – drums

2007 albums
Unsraw albums